Guápiles Airport  is an airport serving Guápiles, a town in Pococí canton, Limón Province, Costa Rica. The runway is within the western section of the town.

See also

 Transport in Costa Rica
 List of airports in Costa Rica

References

External links
 OpenStreetMap - Guápiles
 OurAirports - Guápiles Airport
 FallingRain - Guápiles Airport
 

Airports in Costa Rica
Buildings and structures in Limón Province